Mitra Jouhari is an American comedian, actress, and writer. She is best known for starring in the television series Three Busy Debras, based on the sketch comedy group she co-founded. Jouhari has written for the television series Big Mouth, High Maintenance, and Miracle Workers.

Early life and education 
Jouhari was raised in West Chester, Ohio and is Iranian-American. She was a fan of comedy from childhood and considers the television shows The Daily Show and M*A*S*H pivotal to developing her interest.

She attended Lakota West High School, graduating in 2011. Jouhari attended college at Ohio State University and began to perform improv comedy as a member of 8th Floor Improv, as well as writing for the Sundial Humor Magazine. After taking internships at the TV shows The Daily Show and Late Night, she moved to New York City without graduating to pursue a career in comedy.

Career 
She contributes writing to the website The Reductress, and has written for the television series High Maintenance, Miracle Workers, and Big Mouth. Jouhari's writing for The President Show was nominated for a 2017 Writers Guild of America award.

In 2015, Jouhari co-founded the sketch comedy trio Three Busy Debras alongside Sandy Honig and Alyssa Stonoha. They performed weekly at The Annoyance in Brooklyn, typically to a sold-out audience. The trio later moved to Los Angeles to develop the show for television. A live action comedy series of the same name was picked up by Adult Swim on May 7, 2019. Jouhari, Honig, and Stonoha star in and executive produce Three Busy Debras, which is about the "surreal day-to-day lives of three deranged housewives, all named Debra, in their affluent suburban town of Lemoncurd, Connecticut." The series premiered on March 29, 2020.

In 2015, Jouhari and Catherine Cohen, later joined by Patti Harrison, started co-hosting It's A Guy Thing, a monthly show in Brooklyn.

Jouhari co-hosts podcast Urgent Care with Joel Kim Booster + Mitra Jouhari with comedian Joel Kim Booster under Earwolf.

In 2022, Jouhari guest-starred in an episode of Abbott Elementary, where she played an art teacher named Sahar.

Personal life 
Jouhari resides in Los Angeles. She is also a member of the Democratic Socialists of America.

Awards and nominations

Filmography

Film

Television

References

External links 
Official website
 

Living people
21st-century American actresses
Actresses from Ohio
American women comedians
American women television writers
American people of Iranian descent
Upright Citizens Brigade Theater performers
Ohio State University alumni
1993 births
Screenwriters from Ohio
Comedians from Ohio
21st-century American comedians
21st-century American women writers
American television writers
21st-century American screenwriters
Members of the Democratic Socialists of America